This list of Savannah State University faculty includes current and former faculty, staff and presidents of Georgia State Industrial College for Colored Youth, Georgia State College, Savannah State College, and/or Savannah State University. Notable  graduates, non-graduate former students and current students are found on the List of Savannah State University alumni.

Savannah State University is a four-year, state-supported, historically black university (HBCU) located in Savannah, Georgia. The first baccalaureate degree was awarded in 1898. In 1928 the college became a full four-year degree-granting institution and removed the high school and normal school programs. In 1932 the school became a full member institution of the University System of Georgia.

Administration

Institute presidents

There have been twelve presidents in the history of Savannah State University. The current president is Cheryl Davenport Dozier.

Other administration

Media

Social Sciences

Athletics

See also
Presidents of Savannah State University
Savannah State University faculty
Savannah State Tigers football coaches

References